is a Japanese footballer who plays for J.FC Miyazaki.

Club team career statistics
Updated to 23 February 2018.

References

External links

Profile at SC Sagamihara

1988 births
Living people
Association football people from Hyōgo Prefecture
Japanese footballers
J1 League players
J2 League players
J3 League players
Japan Football League players
Vissel Kobe players
Vegalta Sendai players
Zweigen Kanazawa players
SC Sagamihara players
Nara Club players
J.FC Miyazaki players
Association football midfielders